La polizia è al servizio del cittadino? (internationally released as The Police Serve the Citizens?) is a 1973 Italian giallo-poliziottesco film directed by Romolo Guerrieri. The film is set in Genova.

Cast 
 Enrico Maria Salerno: Commissioner Nicola Sironi
 Giuseppe Pambieri: Commissioner Marino
 John Steiner: Lambro
 Venantino Venantini: Mancinelli
 Alessandro Momo: Michele Sironi
 Memmo Carotenuto: Baron
 Marie Sophie Persson: Cristina
 Daniel Gélin: Ing. Pier Paolo Brera
 Gabriella Giorgelli: Eros, Prostitute
 Enzo Liberti: Greengrocer

Release
The film was released on August 25, 1973. It was distributed by P.I.C. in Italy. The film grossed a total of ₤1.033 billion in Italy.

References

Footnotes

Sources

External links

1973 films
Poliziotteschi films
1973 crime films
Films directed by Romolo Guerrieri
Films scored by Luis Bacalov
1970s Italian films